Bir Bouhouche is a district in Souk Ahras Province, Algeria. It was named after its capital, Bir Bouhouche.

Municipalities
The district is further divided into 3 municipalities:
 Bir Bouhouche
 Zouabi
 Safel El Ouiden

Communes of Souk Ahras Province
Districts of Souk Ahras Province